Famine in Ukraine may refer to:

 1921–1923 famine in Ukraine
 Holodomor, 1932–1933 man-made famine in Soviet Ukraine
 Soviet famine of 1946–1947